Verden can refer to:

 Verden an der Aller, a town in Lower Saxony, Germany
 Verden, Oklahoma, a small town in the USA
 Verden (district), a district in Lower Saxony, Germany
 Diocese of Verden (768–1648), a former diocese of the Catholic Church
 Prince-Bishopric of Verden (1180–1648), a former prince-bishopric in the Holy Roman Empire
 Principality of Verden (1648–1823), a former principality in the Holy Roman Empire
 Verden Allen (born 1944), British musician, former member of the Moot the Hoople
 Verden, a colony of the micronational Aerican Empire